Susan Manning is a dance historian and Professor of English and Theatre at Northwestern University where she holds joint appointments in the English Department and Performance Studies. She is currently chair of English at Northwestern. Her first book, Ecstasy and the Demon, won the 1994 de la Torre Bueno Prize, while her second book, Modern Dance Negro Dance, received an Honorable Mention as Outstanding Publication from the Congress on Research in Dance. Manning has been the president of the Society of Dance History Scholars and is the convener for the Chicago Seminar on Dance and Performance.

Manning graduated from Harvard College with a B.A. in 1978 (student-designed major in dance studies), and her Ph.D. from Columbia University (in 1987) in a cross-departmental program between English and Theatre.

Publications
 Modern Dance Negro Dance: Race in Motion (University of Minnesota Press, 2004)
 Ecstasy and the Demon: Feminism and Nationalism in the Dances of Mary Wigman (University of California Press, 1993)

References

External links
 Society of Dance History Scholars

Dance historians
21st-century American historians
American academics of English literature
Writers from Evanston, Illinois
Living people
American women historians
Harvard College alumni
Columbia University alumni
Historians from Illinois
21st-century American women writers
Year of birth missing (living people)